The Utah Eagles were a basketball team in the Continental Basketball Association.  They played their games in Taylorsville, Utah, and although they started play in the 2006-2007 season, they folded in mid-season.

The Eagles played their home games at the Lifetime Activities Center on the Redwood Campus of Salt Lake Community College - the same gymnasium used for the NBA's annual Rocky Mountain Revue.

The team's roster featured a number of players with local ties, including Harold Arceneaux, a former Weber State player, Bryant Markson, a former University of Utah player and Mike Hall, a former BYU player. John Millsap, the younger brother of Utah Jazz player Paul Millsap, also played for the Eagles. The roster also included talented players from other regions of the country. 
 
Utah won its first game, beating Minot SkyRockets 134–120 on December 2, 2006. It finished its first season with a 6–16 record, then folded on January 23, 2007.  Although the CBA was able to reschedule the remaining opponents' games so that all franchises would finish a 48-game schedule, two games could not be rescheduled and were deemed forfeits by league mandate.  Those two losses meant the Eagles finished with a 6–18 record.

External links
Official Website

Basketball teams established in 2006
Basketball teams disestablished in 2007
Continental Basketball Association teams
Sports in Salt Lake City
2006 establishments in Utah
2007 disestablishments in Utah
Basketball teams in Utah
Taylorsville, Utah